Joe Bretherton (born 5 October 1995) is a professional rugby league footballer who plays as a  for Toulouse Olympique in the Championship. 

He previously played for Wigan Warriors in the Super League.

Background
Bretherton was born in Wigan, Greater Manchester, England.

References

External links
Wigan Warriors profile
SL profile
Toulouse Olympique profile

1995 births
Living people
English rugby league players
Rugby league players from Wigan
Rugby league props
Swinton Lions players
Toulouse Olympique players
Wigan Warriors players
Workington Town players